Przemysław Czajkowski (born 26 October 1988 in Wysokie Mazowieckie) is a Polish athlete specializing in the discus throw.  His personal best in the event is 65.61 meters, achieved in 2012 in Łódź.

He competed for Poland at the 2012 Summer Olympics, failing to qualify for the final.

Competition record

References

 

Polish male discus throwers
Athletes (track and field) at the 2012 Summer Olympics
Olympic athletes of Poland
1988 births
People from Wysokie Mazowieckie
Living people
Sportspeople from Podlaskie Voivodeship
Universiade medalists in athletics (track and field)
Universiade silver medalists for Poland
Medalists at the 2011 Summer Universiade
20th-century Polish people
21st-century Polish people